Ty Mitchell (born 1993) is an American gay pornographic actor and writer.

Work 
Mitchell has a degree in Gender Studies and has written on various topics of LGBTQ life for online publications.

His criticism of the 2020 Oscars, in which he pointed out nominated fewer female directors than the Str8UpGay Awards gay porn awards, went viral. He lives in Brooklyn, New York. His column defending himself attending parties on Fire Island during the COVID-19 pandemic were criticised on social media.

In 2019, he appeared in a skit on Saturday Night Live with actress Emma Stone.

Mitchell was nominated for the Best Newcomer Award at the 2020 GayVN Awards.

References

External links

1992 births
American actors in gay pornographic films
American male non-fiction writers
American pornographic film actors of Filipino descent
Living people
Pornographic film actors from New York (state)
Pornographic film actors from Texas